In the geologic time scale, the Greenlandian is the earliest age or lowest stage of the Holocene Epoch or Series, part of the Quaternary. Beginning in 11,650 BP (9701 BCE or 300 HE) and ending 8,276 BP (6237 BCE or 3764 HE), it is the earliest of three sub-divisions of the Holocene. It was officially ratified by the International Commission on Stratigraphy in June 2018 with the later Northgrippian and Meghalayan Ages/Stages. The lower boundary of the Greenlandian Age is the GSSP sample from the North Greenland Ice Core Project in central Greenland (75.1000°N 42.3200°W). The Greenlandian GSSP has been correlated with the end of Younger Dryas (from near-glacial to interglacial) and a "shift in deuterium excess values".

References

10th millennium BC
01
Geological epochs

03